The Kiona-Benton City School District is a public school district in Benton County, Washington.

Schools
The Ki-Be School District, as it is informally known, includes three schools

Kiona-Benton Elementary School
mascot - Teddy Bears

Kiona-Benton Middle School
mascot - Cubs
colors - Black, White and Blue

Kiona-Benton High School 1A School
mascot - Bears
colors - Blue, Black, and White
accent - Since 2009 black
publications - The Bear (the school's annual yearbook)

Sports

Sports for Elementary School
Grades K-5th have access to multiple athletic programs.
Grid Kids Football
Little Guy Wrestling (Boys and Girls)
AAU Basketball (Boys and Girls)
Little League Baseball
Softball
Youth Soccer (Boys and Girls)

Sports for Middle School
Football
Volleyball
Cross Country (joined with high school)
Wrestling (Boys and Girls)
Basketball (Boys and Girls)
Baseball
Softball
Soccer (Boys and Girls)
Track and Field

Sports for High School
Football
Volleyball
Cross-country
Basketball (Boys and Girls)
Wrestling (Boys and Girls)
Baseball
Softball
Soccer (Boys and Girls)
Track and Field
Tennis
Cheerleading

Performing arts
The school district is currently working on building up respectable programs for Band, Choir, and Drama. As of 2009-2010, KBSD offers Band for 5th grade-8th grade, and Choir for 7th and 8th grade at the Middle School. At the High School, the offerings expand. KBHS currently has one Band, 3 Choirs (Mixed Choir known as "The Ursa Major Chorus", Treble Choir, an a cappella group known as "The Royales"), and Drama classes. The Drama club also offers students the opportunity to perform in full production plays.

Clubs
The high school clubs:
FFA
FBLA
Teen Read Club
Art Club
Science Bowl
TSA 
FCCLA
Buddy Club
Knowledge Bowl
Yearbook

Yearly Activities
Throughout the year the students enjoy "Breaking-down-the-walls," an activity in which students get to know their schoolmates.
In Fall the teenagers' favorite events are Homecoming, the Veterans Day Assembly, Spirit Week and Halloween.
Winter activities include Christmas.
Spring activities are Prom, Senior Skip-day (the last day of school for seniors) and Spring Break.
Camp Wooten is highly enjoyed and eagerly waited for by the 6th graders.

Alumni
James Otto

References

External links
School District official site
Kiona-Benton High School Alumni Site
Ki-Be.com Web Email Account Login
Elementary age soccer site
Unofficial KiBe high school wrestling site
Ki-Be Bears Athletic Boosters
Ki-Be Performing Arts Cherry Blossom 5K Run

School districts in Washington (state)
Education in Benton County, Washington